List of kings of Ani:

Abas I of Armenia first king 928/929–953, son of Smbat I (see Bagratuni Dynasty) and father of Mouchel, first king of Kars
Ashot III (son of Abas I) 953–977
Smbat II (son of Ashot III) 977–989
Gagik I of Armenia  (brother of Smbat II) 989–1020
Hovhannes-Smbat of Ani  (son of Gagik I) 1020–1040/1041
Ashot IV Qadj (usurper) 1021–1039/1040
Gargis of Ani (usurper) 1040/1041–1042
Gagik II (son of Ashot IV) 1042–1045
To the Byzantine Empire 1045

Ani, kings of
Ani